Apocalypsis Damnare (Latin for "Revelation Give a Damn") is the debut album by American doom metal band Rigor Sardonicous. It was released in 1999.

A remade version of the album was released in 2005 under the label Smiling Death Records, featuring two different bass players.

Track listing

Critical reception 

Considered extreme even within a musical style defined by extremism  this is about as uplifting as a post-genocide funeral procession.

Personnel 
 Joseph J. Fogarazzo – guitars, vocals
 Glenn Hampton – vocals, guitars, bass
 Steve Moran – session bass (ex-Evoken)

References

External links 
 [ Allmusic review]
 Blabbermouth review
 RYM review

1999 debut albums
Rigor Sardonicous albums
Paragon Records albums